The 1970 Austrian Grand Prix was a Formula One motor race held at the Österreichring on 16 August 1970. It was race 9 of 13 in both the 1970 World Championship of Drivers and the 1970 International Cup for Formula One Manufacturers. This was the third Austrian Grand Prix, the second as part of the World Championship, and the first at the scenic Österreichring, built to replace the bumpy and bland Zeltweg Airfield circuit.

The 60-lap race was won by Jacky Ickx, driving a Ferrari, after he started from third position. Teammate Clay Regazzoni achieved his first podium finish by coming second, while Rolf Stommelen achieved his only podium finish, coming third in a Brabham-Ford. Local driver and championship leader Jochen Rindt started from pole position in his Lotus-Ford, but retired with an engine failure. It would turn out to be Rindt's final Formula One race start.

Qualifying

Qualifying classification

Race

Classification

Championship standings after the race

Drivers' Championship standings

Constructors' Championship standings

References

Austrian Grand Prix
Grand Prix
Austrian Grand Prix
Austrian Grand Prix